The Electric Building is a building located in downtown Portland, Oregon, listed on the National Register of Historic Places.  It was built in 1910 for the Portland Railway, Light and Power Company, to serve as the company's headquarters and to house its main electricity generating station.

See also
 National Register of Historic Places listings in Southwest Portland, Oregon

References

External links
 

1910 establishments in Oregon
Buildings and structures completed in 1910
Chicago school architecture in Oregon
National Register of Historic Places in Portland, Oregon
Carl L. Linde buildings
Southwest Portland, Oregon
Portland Historic Landmarks